Mohra Bakhtan is a village located in Tehsil Kallar Syedan. Formally, it was a part of Tehsil Kahuta and was later added to Tehsil Kallar Syedan after its creation. The District for Mohra Bakhtan is Rawalpindi, Pakistan, and Union Council is Ghazan Abad. It is considered one of the biggest villages in the tehsil by the ratio of both land and population. The current councilor for the village is Dhok Mirzayan. Construction by corporations on the lower end of Mohra Bakhtan has affected its environment.

Neighborhood 
The nearest village to Mohra Bakhtan is Tirkhi, Chamba Karpal, and Tarell. Pir Garata is the closest route to reach the main stop of Shah bagh. Main road which connects it to Shah bagh is through Pari stop and Nathya Stop. It is directly connected to DHA Valley.

Casts and Sectarianism 
Most of the population is Sunni Muslim but there are others too. Followers of Dawat-e-Islami can be found in huge numbers. Events celebrated round the year include Eid-ul-Adha, Eid-ul-Fitr, Eid-Milad-Nabi, Muharram and Pandaara's (local festivity).

Landmarks

Jamia Masjid Bilal 
This masjid is situated in Mohra Dhok. It is among oldest masjids of area.

Eid-Gah Wali Masjid 
This is situated in upper Dhok. It has a proper Eid-Gah attached to it and is also used for funeral prayers and religious functions.

Sultani Masjid 
This masjid is situated near Dhok Baseera.

Gallery 

 Villages in Kallar Syedan Tehsil